Crown Melbourne (also referred to as Crown Casino and Entertainment Complex) is a casino and resort located on the south bank of the Yarra River, in Melbourne, Australia. Crown Casino is a unit of Crown Limited, and the first casino of the now-international Crown brand.

Initially having opened in 1994 on the north bank of the Yarra, Crown Melbourne relocated and re–opened on the south bank of the Yarra, in 1997. It remains one of the central features of the Southbank precinct of the Melbourne central business district. The entire complex has a space of 510,000 m2—the equivalent to two city blocks—making it the largest casino complex in the Southern Hemisphere and one of the largest in the world. The complex also hosts three hotels, Crown Towers, Crown Promenade, and Crown Metropol.

It is open 24 hours a day, seven days a week except on Christmas Day, Good Friday and Anzac Day when it is closed from 4 a.m. to midday. It was founded, owned and run by Lloyd Williams until the Packer takeover by Publishing and Broadcasting Limited in 1999.

The casino is accessible by tram routes 12, 58, 96, 109 which all pass near Southern Cross railway station and the Melbourne City Centre.

Opening and statistics

Temporary location 
Crown Casino opened on 30 June 1994 at the World Trade Centre on the northern bank of the Yarra River. This location was a temporary, and training, setup while construction of the proper complex occurred.

Permanent location 
Crown's permanent location opened on 8 May 1997 of the southern bank of the Yarra River. It was designed by a team of architects and interior designers working in collaboration, including : Bates Smart, Perrott Lyon Mathieson and Daryl Jackson (in association). Principal practitioners included architects Lyndon Hayward, Bob Sinclair, Peter Dredge, and Hamish Lyon, and interior designers Jeff Copolov, Paul Hecker, Jackie Johnston, Kathy Hall, Fiona Ennis, Jan Eastwood, and Kerry Phelan.

On opening night, Actress Rachel Griffiths infamously ran through the casino topless on its opening night to protest the project.

It is one of the central features of the Southbank area in the central business district and the Crown Towers fronts onto the waterfront as part of Southbank Promenade. Children under the age of 18 are permitted into the entertainment and shopping section of complex, but not into the gaming area or areas serving alcohol. The entire complex has a space of 510,000 m2, making it the largest casino complex in the Southern Hemisphere and one of the largest in the world.

Crown Casino has a licence for 540 table games (100 poker tables) and 2,500 poker machines.

Casino games

Baccarat 
Baccarat is the most popular game at Crown and a large portion of Crown's revenue comes from Baccarat. The different variations of Baccarat that Crown offers include:

 Traditional Baccarat - in this variation, any banker win pays out 95%. This version is only available in the Mahogany Room and in other exclusive salons and lounges with a minimum bet of $100.
Crown Baccarat - this variation is more commonly known as 'no-commission Baccarat' where the house payout is 50% when the banker wins with a point total '6'. The minimum bet is typically $100, however, there are tables throughout the complex with a $50 minimum bet, namely in the Tia To area.
2 to 1 Baccarat - this variation is a lower limit version of Baccarat and usually has a minimum bet of $25. The rules feature no commission on bets and 2 to 1 payouts when the banker wins with 3 cards on 8 or 9, however, ties lose.

Blackjack 
Blackjack is a game found throughout Crown Casino and in many casinos around the globe. There are more than 10 different variations of Blackjack at crown and the availability of different versions are on constant rotation. The most common variations include:

 Traditional Blackjack - this variation is only found in the Mahogany Room and in other exclusive salons and lounges. The key feature of Traditional Blackjack is that the dealer stands on a 'soft 17'.
 Crown Blackjack - this variation of blackjack is the same as Tradition Blackjack with the only difference being that the dealer hits on a 'soft 17'. Crown Blackjack can be found in any area outside the Mahogany Room and usually has a minimum bet of $25–100.
 Blackjack Plus - this variation of blackjack has a much higher house edge than Crown Blackjack and as a result, the typical minimum bet is $10–20. The rules feature a stand-off when the dealer achieves a total '22' and in return players are able to double down with three cards in their hand, get an instant payout on 21, 'five-and-under' wins, and the other rules. Blackjack Plus has been described as "the worst game of blackjack in Australia" due to the house advantage of around 5%.

Poker machines 
Crown Casino has 2,500 poker machines. on the casino floor, with values ranging from one cent to one dollar, as well as a few two and five-dollar machines in the VIP areas. Slot machines at Crown are made by Aristocrat, Ainsworth Gaming Technology (AGT), IGT, Konami and SHFL entertainment/Shuffle Master and WMS Gaming, the latter using Shuffle Master machines.

Crown poker 
The Crown Poker Room encompasses a large separate space in the Crown basement underneath the food court. The games on offer include No Limit Hold 'em, PLO, as well as variations such as Three Card Poker and Mississippi Stud.

Crown also host a number poker tournaments including the Aussie Millions which is the largest poker tournament in the Southern Hemisphere.

Other games 
Crown provides many other games including Big Wheel, Casino War, Pai Gow, Roulette, and Sic Bo. It was also the first to introduce an electronic version of roulette known as Rapid Roulette.

The Crown is also one of the major centres for competitive poker in the Asia-Pacific region. It annually hosts the Aussie Millions, currently the Southern Hemisphere's richest poker event. Starting in 2013, it became home to the World Series of Poker Asia-Pacific, the latest expansion of the World Series of Poker.

Restaurants, bars and retail

There are several nightclubs and restaurants as well as "Kingpin" (formerly Galactic Circus), an electronic games arcade, laser tag game, bowling alley, and many luxury brands.

Restaurants

Conservatory
Koko
Rockpool Bar and Grill
Nobu Melbourne
The Atlantic
Silks
Bistro Guillaume

Luxury brands

BVLGARI
Monards
Van Bercken
Graff Diamonds
Kennedy
Prada
Salvatore Ferragamo
Louis Vuitton
Paspaley
Omega
Hugo Boss

Hotels 

Crown has three hotel towers:

 Crown Towers: a skyscraper comprising a five-star luxury hotel located within the Crown Entertainment Complex. It houses 481 rooms and villas over 38 floors. Located on the banks of the Yarra River it overlooks the city centre, Kings Domain, Port Phillip and Docklands.
 Crown Metropol: reputedly Australia's largest hotel by number of rooms. This five-star hotel houses 658 rooms across 28 floors.
 Crown Promenade: a 465-room, 4.5-star hotel on 23 floors. It is located on the block behind Crown Towers and is connected to the main complex by a pedestrian overpass. It also houses Australia's only purpose built hotel conference facility the 'Crown Conference Centre'.

A fourth hotel, One Queensbridge, had plans for its construction approved, however, plans unfortunately fell through due to a failure to acquire financing.

Notable guests at Crown's hotels
Notable guests at the Crown Towers, Crown Metropol and Crown Promenade Hotels have included Celine Dion, Tom Cruise, Katie Holmes, Kim Kardashian, Katy Perry, Nicole Kidman, Rachel Griffiths, One Direction, Keanu Reeves, Kerry Packer, Tiger Woods and Neil Murray and many other high-profile celebrities and politicians. Roger Federer, Rafael Nadal, and several other tennis players often stay at the Casino during the Australian Open.

Attractions

The Palladium Ballroom

The Palladium at Crown is a ballroom with a seating capacity of 1500.  It has played host to some of Australia's premier functions, including the annual TV Week Logie Awards, Brownlow Medal, Melbourne Victory Player of the Year Medal, Allan Border Medal, the Australian Formula One Grand Prix ball and the Melbourne Press Club Quill award for excellence in journalism.

Water features
Water features appear both inside and outside the Crown Casino complex. They include the Seasons of Fortune, Southern Porte Cochere, Revelry, and Celebration.

Gas brigades fire show

Along the Yarra River, outside crown, there are eight towers, at night these towers shoot spheres of fire, almost 3 meters in diameter, in the air at choreographed intervals. The show occurs every hour with times of operating depending on the season of the year and do not operate in strong winds or when a total fire ban is declared.

The Gas Brigades are an iconic part of Melbourne and is commonly sought by visiting tourists.

While these brigades use a considerable amount of gas to operate, Crown offset the energy emissions created.

Controversies

Criminal activities 
In 2016, eighteen employees of Crown Casino were detained by Chinese police after having been accused of resorting to gambling crimes.
In June 2022, the Victorian Gambling and Casino Control Commission (VGCCC) stated Crown Melbourne aided in the processing of A$164 million in transactions and earned A$32 million in income from illicit payments. The illicit payments came from Chinese gamblers and the company aided in unlawfully transferring the money out of the country. Due to this the company had been fined A$80 million.
In November 2022, Crown Melbourne was sanctioned with A$120 million in fines for breaches of responsible gambling legislation which had occurred for over a decade. Some of the breaches Crown was fined for included allowing its patrons to gamble for periods of over 24 hours without taking a break and the failure to stop patrons from using plastic picks to engage in auto-play on Poker Machines. The chair of the VGCCC, Fran Thorn, said that "for a long time, Crown had promoted itself as having the world’s best approach to problem gambling. Nothing could be further from the truth" and that the casino operator "prioritised revenue maximisation over its obligations to protect patrons."

The Finkelstein Royal Commission 

 The Royal Commission into the Casino Operator and Licence heavily criticised crown for a variety of illegal and unethical activities. The commission's findings of Crown include money laundering, strong ties to organised criminal networks, and found other serious problems with Crown's corporate governance among other things. Essentially, the Royal Commission made the recommendation that Crown be put under a two-year review period where they are able to keep their license to operate, but have to make major changes in order to facilitate a legal casino operation and responsible gambling. This includes the appointment of an inspector to monitor and ascertain whether money laundering, loan sharking, or illicit drug sales were taking place and exclude people when necessary.
 The Victorian State Government accepted the recommendations made by the commission and has introduced the Casino and Gambling Legislation Amendment Bill 2021 which appoints a Special Manager to oversee all operations and decision making of Crown, establishes a new regulator known as the Victorian Gambling and Casino Control Commission which has new powers and imposes more obligations on Crown, and bans Junket operations among other things.

Thefts 
In 2002, Thomas Mangos, a 39-year-old man from Bundoora, stole $136,000 from crown casino's Mahogany Room using a fake gun. Mangos' armed robbery occurred after he was "seduced" by the casino and lost $1 million gambling. He later turned himself into police, was charged, pleaded guilty, and was subsequently sentenced to a 5 years term of imprisonment with a 3-year non-parole period.
In 2013, a man with access to the video feeds from Crown's security cameras via an accomplice cheated the casino out of $33 million.

Other 
In September 2015, Rochelle Nolan the fiancée and de facto wife of entertainer/comedian Russell Gilbert, took her own life after a battle with depression and was found deceased in one of the rooms of the hotel.

See also 
 Crown Sydney
 Crown Perth
 Crown London Aspinalls
 Crown Macau - closed down

References

External links

CrownLimited.com
Royal Commission into the Casino Operator and Licence Website

Casinos completed in 1997
Landmarks in Melbourne
Casinos in Australia
Hotels in Melbourne
Tourist attractions in Melbourne
1994 establishments in Australia
Retail buildings in Victoria (Australia)
Buildings and structures in the City of Melbourne (LGA)
Southbank, Victoria